Leavenworth Riverfront Community Center was a former Union Pacific railroad station located in Leavenworth, Kansas, United States.  It is also known as the Old Union Depot when it was listed on the National Register of Historic Places (NRHP) in 1987.  It is currently known as the Leavenworth Riverfront Community Center.

History
It was built as a Union Pacific Railroad Depot in 1888 by James A. McGonigle, to a design by the Chicago architecture firm Cobb and Frost.

In 1984, V.B. Greenamyre and Family sold the building to the city of Leavenworth. Using funds from a bond issue, the depot was renovated with a basketball gym, cardiovascular fitness room, weight and strength training room, racquetball courts, an indoor pool, activity rooms, meeting rooms and a 1/10-of a mile indoor walking track. The facility opened to the public in 1988, 100 years after its construction.

A newer South Wing Room was remodeled in 2012.  The facility's brick and sandstone exterior began renovations in 2014. The city of Leavenworth received a grant from the Kansas State Department of Transportation in 2010 to replace the sandstone

Current facility
The Leavenworth Parks and Recreation Department staffs this facility and manages maintenance, room rentals and activity programs. It is open Monday through Friday from 6 a.m. to 8 p.m., Saturdays 9 a.m. to 5 p.m. and Sundays 1 p.m. to 5 p.m.

Gallery

See also

 National Register of Historic Places listings in Leavenworth County, Kansas

Further reading
 History of Leavenworth County Kansas; Jesse Hall and LeRoy Hand; Historical Publishing; 684 pages; 1921. (27MB PDF)

References

External links

 Riverfront Community Center, city of Leavenworth
 Leavenworth City Map, KDOT
Historical
 
 
 Leavenworth County Historical Society

Railway stations on the National Register of Historic Places in Kansas
National Register of Historic Places in Leavenworth County, Kansas
Transportation in Leavenworth County, Kansas
Union Pacific Railroad stations
Former Missouri Pacific Railroad stations
Railway stations in the United States opened in 1888
Romanesque Revival architecture in Kansas
Community centers in the United States
Former railway stations in Kansas
1888 establishments in Kansas